Godów may refer to the following places in Poland:
 Godów, Lublin Voivodeship (east Poland)
 Godów, Silesian Voivodeship (south Poland)
 Godów, Świętokrzyskie Voivodeship (south-central Poland)